The List of Narcissus horticultural divisions is a classification of the cultivated varieties of the genus Narcissus, which are predominantly spring perennial plants in the family Amaryllidaceae. Most species and cultivars are known by the common name daffodil, while a few are called jonquils.

The list of Narcissus horticultural divisions provided by the Royal Horticultural Society (RHS) is the standard method used to classify and describe cultivated varieties (cultivars) of Narcissus. It is widely used since the RHS is the international authority for the registration of such cultivars. For horticultural purposes, all Narcissus cultivars are split into 13 divisions, as described by Kington (1998), for the RHS, based partly upon flower form (shape and length of corona – the "trumpet" or "cup"), particularly the ratio of corona to length of perianth segments (tepals or "petals"), the number of flowers per stem, flowering period and partly upon the genetic background. Division 11 (Split-corona) with its two subdivisions was the most recent group to be described (1969). Division 13, which includes all the wild rather than cultivated daffodils, is the exception to this scheme.
This classification is a useful tool for planning planting. Most commercially available narcissi come from Divisions 1 (Trumpet), 2 (Large-cupped) and 8 (Tazetta).

Growers register new daffodil cultivars by name and colour with the RHS, whose International Daffodil Register is regularly updated with supplements available online and is searchable. The most recent supplement (2014) is the sixth; the fifth was published in 2012. More than 27,000 names were registered as of 2008, and the number has continued to grow. However, because of synonymy, the actual number is probably closer to 18,000; only about 500 are in commercial production (470 in 2009–2010).

Registered daffodils are given a division number and colour code such as 5W-W ('Thalia'). In horticultural usage it is not uncommon to also find another unofficial division of 'Miniatures', which, although drawn from the other 13 divisions, have their miniature size in common. These are sometimes referred to by nurseries as 'Division 14'. Over 140 narcissus cultivars have gained the Royal Horticultural Society's Award of Garden Merit.

Colour code 

Daffodils may be self-coloured—i.e., both perianth and corona identical in colour and shade—or the colours between the perianth and corona may differ widely. Some perianths and some coronas may also contain more than one colour or shade. Prevalent colours are all shades and tones of yellow, white, orange, pink, red and green. Pinks vary from apricot to rose in shades from pale to deep, and some more recent cultivars have hints of lavender or lilac. Reds vary from orange-red to salmon red to near scarlet. Pink, red, orange and green tones are mainly confined to the corona. However, breeders are currently working against the genus' natural pigmentation and genetic barriers to create cultivars in which pink, rose, red, orange and green tones suffuse or "bleed" from the more highly coloured coronas onto the perianth segments of white or yellow. There is an increasing number of commercially available varieties which display this enhanced colouration.

The colour classification lists the perianth colour and then the corona colour.  In the case of multiple colours, the perianth colours are assigned from the outer edge of the perianth segments inward to their juncture with the base of the corona, while the corona colours are assigned from the base of the corona outward to the rim. Thus, 'Accent', a Large Cup (Division 2) Daffodil possessing a white perianth and a pink corona, is officially classified as 2W-P, 'Geranium', Tazetta (Division 8) with a white perianth and orange corona is 8W-O and 'Actaea', Poeticus (Division 9), with white perianth and multicoloured corona is 9W-GYR.

Definitions of divisions

See also 
 List of Narcissus species
 List of Award of Garden Merit narcissus

Notes

References

Bibliography 

 
 
 

Narcissus (plant)